La Roque-Baignard is a commune in the Calvados department in the Normandy region in northwestern France.

Population

Personalities
André Gide was mayor of La Roque-Baignard in 1896.

See also
Communes of the Calvados department

References

Communes of Calvados (department)
Calvados communes articles needing translation from French Wikipedia